Casa de Brinquedos is a 1983 album by Toquinho for children. It counts with the coloboration of Mutinho for compositions and the participation of various artist, like Tom Zé, Chico Buarque, Moraes Moreira and Baby Consuelo. All the arrangements were elaborated by Rogério Duprat.

Track listing

Personnel
Rogério Duprat - arrangement and conducting

References

1983 albums
Toquinho albums